Roberto Frinolli (Rome, 13 November 1940) is a former athlete Italian specializing in the 400 metres hurdles.

Biography
Born in Garbatella, he attended athletics school, first trying the 110 metres hurdles before settling on the 400 hurdles.  He went on to become the Italian national champion six times, 1963-1966 and 1968-9.

He qualified for three Olympics, 1964 through 1972, making it to the final in 1964 and 1968.  At the 1968 Olympics, he ran his personal best of 49.14 in the semi-finals, placing him in the center of the track for the final.  He ran an even pace with eventual winner David Hemery who was in the process of setting the world record.  Frinolli paid for that hard early pace, struggling home in last place.

Frinolli was ranked number one in the world in 1965 and 1966.  He won the  1966 European Championships and twice at the World University Games. He is the father of Giorgio Frinolli.

See also
 FIDAL Hall of Fame
 Italy national relay team

References

External links
 

1940 births
Living people
Italian male hurdlers
Athletes (track and field) at the 1964 Summer Olympics
Athletes (track and field) at the 1968 Summer Olympics
Athletes (track and field) at the 1972 Summer Olympics
Olympic athletes of Italy
Athletes from Rome
European Athletics Championships medalists
Universiade medalists in athletics (track and field)
Mediterranean Games gold medalists for Italy
Mediterranean Games medalists in athletics
Athletes (track and field) at the 1963 Mediterranean Games
Universiade gold medalists for Italy
Universiade bronze medalists for Italy
Medalists at the 1963 Summer Universiade
Medalists at the 1965 Summer Universiade
20th-century Italian people